Dilan Chandima (born 12 February 1990) is a Sri Lankan cricketer. He made his Twenty20 debut for Sri Lanka Navy Sports Club in the 2009–10 Premier Trophy on 2 October 2009.

References

External links
 

1990 births
Living people
Sri Lankan cricketers
Sri Lanka Navy Sports Club cricketers
Place of birth missing (living people)